Carenum janthinum is a species of ground beetle in the subfamily Scaritinae. It was described by William John Macleay in 1883.

References

janthinum
Beetles described in 1883